Imbrasia is a genus of moths belonging to the family Saturniidae first described by Jacob Hübner in 1819. Species of this genus are present in the tropical Africa.

List of selected species 
Imbrasia epimethea (Drury, 1822) – Cameroon
Imbrasia ertli Rebel, 1904 – Zambia
Imbrasia longicaudata (Holland, 1894)
Imbrasia obscura (Butler, 1878) – Cameroon
Imbrasia truncata Aurivillius, 1908 – Cameroon
Imbrasia vesperina Stoneham, 1962

References

 "Imbrasia". National Center for Biotechnology Information. 

Saturniinae
Moth genera
Taxa named by Jacob Hübner